The Response boat - Small II, also known as RB-S II, is a small vessel in service in the US Coast Guard. The boats perform a variety of missions such has PWCS (Ports, Waterways, and Coastal Security), law enforcement, counter narcotics operations, search and rescue, migrant interdiction, and environmental response operations.

Design
The new design of the Response Boat-Small focuses more on crew comfort, visibility, safety and protection. To improve visibility they have 360 degree visibility, for comfort they have an ergonomic design and shock mitigating seats, and for safety and protection they are equipped with ballistic protection to provide the crew small arms protection. The boats have fore and aft gun mount for M240B machine guns. The boats can also carry a variety of small arms ranging from rifles, shotguns, and pistols. The boat is made of premium-grade 5086 aluminum alloy.

See also
Defender-class boat
List of equipment of the United States Coast Guard

References

Boats of the United States Coast Guard
Equipment of the United States Coast Guard